HMS Gleaner  or HMSML Gleaner has been the name of more than one ship of the Royal Navy of the United Kingdom, and may refer to:

 , a mercantile ketch launched in 1802, hired in 1808, purchased in 1809, and lost in 1814
 , a gunvessel launched in 1833, renamed HMS Gleaner in 1838, and scrapped in 1849
 , a gunboat launched in 1854 and sold in 1868
 , a torpedo gunboat launched in 1890 and sold in 1905
 , a tender acquired in 1906 and sold in 1921
 , a survey vessel launched in 1937, converted into a minesweeper in 1939, and sold in 1950
 , a survey motor launch in commission from 1983 to 2018

Royal Navy ship names